Kings River can refer to:

In Ireland
 Kings River (Ireland)

In the United States

Kings River, former name of Centerville, Fresno County, California
Kings River (Arkansas) in Arkansas and Missouri, United States
Kings River (California) in California, United States
Kings River (Nevada) in Nevada, United States
Kings River (Alaska) in Alaska, United States

See also 
 Kings Creek (disambiguation)
 Kings (disambiguation)
 King River (disambiguation)